WFRK (95.3 FM), known as "Live 95", is a talk formatted radio station licensed to Quinby, South Carolina. The station is owned by Community Broadcasters, LLC and is simulcast on WHYM and WTQS.

History
Originally, Frank FM aired on W246AW 97.1, a translator with 250 watts which simulcast the WSIM HD-2 channel. Later, Frank FM became a full power station at 95.3. Music came from the 60s through the present, with artists that included Jimmy Buffett, The Beatles, Rod Stewart, Madonna, Hootie & the Blowfish and Phil Collins. The slogan was "We play it all".

On July 19, 2012, WFRK began moving to a talk format as Live 95, while Frank FM returned to the translator and is again branded "97.1 Frank FM". The changed was planned for August 1, but on July 16, WJMX dropped Rush Limbaugh, and WFRK announced July 18 that it was adding the show.  Other shows will include "Kinard and Koffee in the Morning".  After Limbaugh's passing in 2020, Premiere Premiere Networks announced that its evening host Buck Sexton and Fox Sports Radio personality Clay Travis would take over Limbaugh's time slot as The Clay Travis and Buck Sexton Show beginning June 21, 2021.  Unlike Limbaugh's program, The Clay Travis and Buck Sexton Show currently airs on WJMX, owned by IHeartMedia.

References

External links

FRK